Panthera palaeosinensis was an early Pleistocene species from northern China. It is often incorrectly referenced as the ancestor of the tiger, Panthera tigris, although it shares features with all living large cats. Recent studies place it close to the base of the genus Panthera.

Panthera palaeosinensis was first described in 1924 as Felis paleosinensis by Otto Zdansky in his work "Jungtertiäre Carnivoren Chinas". The dating is not certain, but estimates place it around the Plio-Pleistocene boundary at two to three million years old. The conical upper canines were not present in the fossil, but the lower canines bear the vertical grooves typical of Panthera.

 References 

 Mazák, V. 1981. Panthera tigris''. Mammalian Species, 152: 1–8. American Society of Mammalogists. (Available online)

Palaeosinensis
Prehistoric pantherines
Pleistocene carnivorans
Pleistocene mammals of Asia
Fossil taxa described in 1924